Since independence, the Indian National Congress has participated in elections, Lok Sabha and Vidhan Sabha. This article shows a list of the results of the elections for Congress.

Andhra Pradesh

Legislative Assembly Elections

As Hyderabad State

As Andhra Pradesh

General Elections

As Hyderabad State

As Andhra Pradesh

Arunachal Pradesh

Legislative Assembly Elections

General Elections

Assam

Legislative Assembly Elections

General Elections

Bihar

Legislative Assembly Elections

General Elections

Chandigarh

General Election

Chhattisgarh

Legislative Assembly Elections

General Elections

Dadra and Nagar Haveli

General Elections

Daman and Diu

General Elections

Delhi

Legislative Assembly Elections

General Elections

Goa

Legislative Assembly Elections

As Goa, Daman and Diu

 As Goa

General Elections

As Goa, Daman and Diu

 As Goa

Gujarat

Legislative Assembly Elections

Haryana

Legislative Assembly Elections

General Elections

Himachal Pradesh

Legislative Assembly Elections

General Elections

Jammu and Kashmir

Legislative Assembly Elections
As Jammu Kashmir State

General Elections

As Jammu and Kashmir Union Territory

Ladakh

Jharkhand

Legislative Assembly Elections

General Elections

Karnataka

Legislative Assembly Elections

As Mysore

As Karnataka

General Elections

As Mysore

As Karnataka

Kerala

Legislative Assembly Elections

As Travancore-Cochin

As Kerala

General Elections

As Travancore-Cochin

Kerala

Lakshadweep

General Election

Madhya Pradesh

Legislative Assembly Elections

General Elections

Maharashtra

Legislative Assembly

Manipur

Legislative Assembly

General Assembly

Meghalaya

Legislative Assembly

General Elections

Mizoram

Legislative Assembly

General Assembly

Nagaland

Legislative Assembly

General Assembly

Odisha

Assembly Elections

General Elections

Puducherry

Legislative Assembly

General Elections

Punjab

Legislative Assembly Election

General Election

Rajasthan

Legislative Assembly Elections

General Elections

Sikkim

Legislative Assembly Election

General Election

Tamil Nadu

Legislative Assembly Election

As Madras State

As Tamil Nadu

General Election

As Madras State

As Tamil Nadu

Telangana

Legislative Assembly Election

General Election

Tripura

Legislative Assembly Election

General Election

Uttar Pradesh

Legislative Assembly Elections

General Election

Uttarakhand

Legislative Assembly Election

General Election

West Bengal

Legislative Assembly Elections

General Election

Ajmer

Bhopal

Bombay

Coorg

Kutch

Madhya Bharat

Patiala and East Punjab States Union

Saurashtra

Vindhya Pradesh

Notes

References

Indian National Congress